Pachybathron olssoni is a species of very small sea snail, a marine gastropod mollusk or micromollusk in the family Cystiscidae.

Description
"Members of the order Neogastropoda are mostly gonochoric and broadcast spawners. Embryos develop into planktonic trocophore larvae and later into juvenile veligers before becoming fully grown adults."

Distribution

References

olssoni
Cystiscidae
Gastropods described in 2002